Ahsham-e Ahmad or Ahsham Ahmad may refer to:
 Ahsham-e Ahmad, Deyr
 Ahsham-e Ahmad, Ganaveh